Avner Laskin (born May 11, 1969) is an Israeli chef, restaurateur, and caterer.

Career 
Avner's career began in his teens, when he started working at Eidan Bistro in 1987 as a shift manager. He worked there for 6 years, until 1993, assisting the kitchen staff in addition to his managerial responsibilities. Right after his stint in Eidan Bistro he established his own restaurant, Bix Tavern, which specialized in seafood.

In 1998, he went to France to study in Le Cordon Bleu, acquiring a Grand Diplome de cuisine et de patisserie. Afterwards, he studied in École professionnelle Lenôtre and received a Diplome de pain de tradition et de qualite.

In 1999, he opened De Luca, an artisan bakery, in Tel Aviv, which was closed in 2003. It was closed in favor of establishing an international consultant company, ZLA Ltd, which specializes in consultation regarding bakeries.

In 2014, he became general manager and head chef for Bulthaup Culinary Academy which is located in Tel Aviv, whilst simultaneously opening a new restaurant: Rak Hayom (meaning: "Only Today").

Bibliography 
Avner has written many culinary books, ranging across a plethora of subjects.
 Hummus: And 65 Other Delicious & Healthy Chickpea Recipes (2006), 
 Ice Cream Maker Companion: 100 Easy-to-Make Frozen Desserts of All Kinds (2006), 
 Cooking with Chocolate: More than 70 Entrées, Drinks, and Decadent Desserts (2007), 
 Artisan Patisserie for the Home Baker (2007), 
 The Easy Way to Artisan Breads & Pastries (2007), 
 Olives: More than 70 Delicious & Healthy Recipes (2008), 
 Nuts: More than 75 Delicious & Healthy Recipes (2008), 
 Honey: More than 75 Delicious & Healthy Recipes (2008), 
 Tomatoes: More Than 70 Delicious Recipes (2008), 
 Celebrating Cobblers and Pies (2010), 
 Celebrating Ice Cream and Cake (2010), 
 Deliciously Healthy Baking (2012),

References 

1969 births
Living people
Israeli chefs